Aqa Baba or Aka-Baba may refer to:

Aqa Baba, Buin Zahra
Aqa Baba, Qazvin